The Tiptree Residents Association was a residents' association in Tiptree, Essex, England.

Politics
Three councillors representing the Residents Association were elected onto Colchester Borough Council in 1973 when the new council was created. The Residents Association formally stood candidates for elections until the 1990s, when J. Webb was the last RA councillor to stand for election. They have not stood candidates since 2001.

References

Politics of Colchester
Locally based political parties in England
Tiptree